Switchh (stylised as SWITCHH) is a 2021 Indian Hindi-language action thriller film directed by Mustufa Raj starring Vikrant Massey. It was produced by Nine Hope Productions and released digitally on Eros Now.

Premise 
Three con artists use their charm to dupe wealthy victims out of cash.

Cast 
 Vikrant Massey as Sam
 Naren Kumar as Neil Rai
 Tanvi Vyas as Ruheena
 Madhua Sneha as Myra
 Hanif Hilal as Pacha
 Armen Grayg

Reception 
Ronak Kotecha of The Times of India gave it a poor review with 2 stars saying, "‘Switchh’ has been in the making for years and director Mustafa Raj makes no attempt to upgrade his product in any way". Akhila Damodaran of OTT Play wrote that "The film, directed by Mustufa Raj, is poorly executed and drags for over two hours with over-the-top twists in the story".

References

External links 
 

2020s Hindi-language films
2021 action thriller films
2021 crime thriller films
2021 films
Films about con artists
Indian action thriller films
Indian crime thriller films